Carlo Buzzi (circa 1607–1658) was an Italian architect, active in Milan.

There appear to be two prominent artists of the same name in Milan, overlapping somewhat, alive in the late 16th and early 17th century. The present Carlo Buzzi, whose name may also be written as Buti, Buzio, Butio, Albutio, or Albuzio, is mentioned in 1629, after the death of Fabio Mangione, as architect of the Duomo of Milan. At this time Francesco Maria Richini soon became architect for the cathedral. An sketch (1647) by Buzzi of a plan for the facade of the cathedral, etched by Cesare Bassani show a Gothic design with two flanking bell-towers; this work was not completed until the 19th-century.

A different Carlo Buzzi painted some of the Quadrone paintings on display inside the cathedral.

References

1607 births
1658 deaths
Italian Baroque architects